The Art of Pretending to Swim is the fourth studio album by Irish band Villagers. It was released on 21 September 2018 under Domino Recording Company.

Release
On 12 June 2018, the band announced the release of their new album, along with the single "A Trick Of The Light".

The second single "Fool" was released on 20 August 2018.

The third single "Again" was released on 10 September 2018.

Critical reception

The Art of Pretending to Swim was met with "generally favorable" reviews from critics. At Metacritic, which assigns a weighted average rating out of 100 to reviews from mainstream publications, this release received an average score of 77, based on 15 reviews. Aggregator Album of the Year gave the release a 75 out of 100 based on a critical consensus of 15 reviews.

Mark Deming from AllMusic wrote about the album: "This music feels warmer and more naturalistic than his earlier experiments with one-man recording, and there's a gentle swing in the rhythms that suggests he's been listening to some smooth R&B lately. [The album] is a strong example of how one man with an unlimited number of tracks to fill can create a compelling and revealing collection of songs.

Accolades

Track listing

Charts

Personnel

Musicians
 Conor J. O'Brien – vocals
 Cormac Curran – keyboard
 Kate Ellis – cello
 Cormac Ó Haodáin – french horn
 Deirdre O'Leary – clarinet
 Maaike Van Der Linde – flute
 Alan Darcy – sax
 Colm O'Hara – trombone
 Kevin Kelleher – trumpet
 Lisa Dowdall – viola
 Larissa O'Grady – violin
 Siobhán Kane – backing vocals

'Production
 Gavin Glass – engineer
 Peter Ashmore – engineer

References

2018 albums
Villagers (band) albums
Domino Recording Company albums